In the Battle of al-Buqaia in 1163, the Crusaders and their allies inflicted a rare defeat on Nur ad-Din Zangi, the Emir of Aleppo and Damascus. King Amalric I led the army of the Kingdom of Jerusalem, together with contingents from the northern Latin states, a substantial body of pilgrims who had just arrived from France, and a force brought by the Byzantine governor of Cilicia. For the Christian forces, this victory only gave a brief respite from the sustained Muslim offensive.

Background
Nur ad-Din proved to be one of the most dangerous enemies the Frankish kingdom had ever faced. Starting out as Emir of Aleppo, he steadily increased his territory at the expense of his Muslim and Latin neighbors, until he gained the great city of Damascus in 1154. He seriously defeated the Crusaders at the Battle of Lake Huleh in 1157, but fell very ill immediately afterward. This event allowed the Franks a chance to recover and, with the help of Thierry of Alsace and an army of pilgrims, to capture Harim castle later in the year. However, an attack on Shaizar failed when Reynald of Châtillon, the Prince of Antioch, quarreled with the other Franks. Consequently, Shaizar soon became the property of Nur ad-Din. In 1158, Thierry and King Baldwin III beat Nur ad-Din at Butaiha, northeast of Tiberias. The year 1160 saw the capture of Reynald, who spent the next 16 years in Nur ad-Din's dungeons. In December 1161, the Byzantine Emperor Manuel I Comnenus married Maria of Antioch and this event gave Antioch a strong protector in the emperor.

Both Amalric and Nur ad-Din soon became aware of the weakness of Fatimid Egypt, whose government had fallen into a state of decay. After the assassination of Caliph al-Zafir and a series of palace coups, Shawar seized power in 1162, was soon deposed, and appealed to Nur ad-Din for help. Neither the Latin king nor the Muslim emir could afford to let the other capture the rich prize of Egypt. Accordingly, Nur ad-Din sent his lieutenant Shirkuh with an army to support the Egyptian vizier.

Battle
While Shirkuh campaigned in Egypt, Nur ad-Din mounted an offensive in Lebanon. Following Latin policy, King Amalric took an army to support his northern vassals, Bohemund III of Antioch and Raymond III of Tripoli. Fortuitously, a large group of French pilgrims led by Hugh VIII of Lusignan and Geoffrey Martel, the brother of William IV of Angoulême, joined the king of Jerusalem. In addition, Konstantinos Kalamanos, the governor of Cilicia brought his Greek warriors to assist the Crusaders. Nur ad-Din was no match for such a formidable combination of enemies and his army suffered a defeat near al-Buqaia (located between Krak des Chevaliers and Beqaa Valley, in modern-day Akkar District, Lebanon). Both Muslims and Franks were impressed by the fighting qualities of the Byzantine soldiers. The negative result of al-Buqaia only made Nur ad-Din more keen for revenge.

Aftermath

Believing his northern front secure, Amalric took his army to Egypt. He found himself in a three-way contest between his Franks, Shirkuh, and Shawar, with the latter trying to maintain Egyptian independence. Amalric ousted Shirkuh from Egypt in 1164, but the king had to rapidly abandon Egypt upon the news of a great disaster in the north. The next major encounter would be the Battle of Harim.

References

Bibliography
 
 
 
 

Battles of the Crusades
Battles involving the Seljuk Empire
Medieval Lebanon
Conflicts in 1163
1163 in Asia
Battles involving the Byzantine Empire
1160s in the Byzantine Empire
Buqaia
Buqaia
1160s in the Crusader states
Battles involving the Zengid dynasty